Atria may refer to:

Science
Atrium (heart) (plural: atria), an anatomical structure of the heart
Atria (genus), a flatworm genus in the family Dendrocoelidae
Atria (star) or Alpha Trianguli Australis, a star in the constellation Triangulum Australe

Companies and brands
Atria (company), a large Finnish food company
Atria Convergence Technologies, an Indian telecommunications company 
Atria Publishing Group, an imprint of Simon & Schuster
Atria Senior Living, a North American assisted-living company
Atria Software, the original maker of ClearCase
Atria Watford, a shopping centre in Watford, Hertfordshire, UK

Places
Adria, or Atria, an Etruscan city in the Veneto region of Northern Italy
Atri, Abruzzo, or Atria, an ancient city in the Abruzzo region of Central Italy
Atria Park District, a mixed-use development zone in Mandurriao, Iloilo City, Philippines

Other uses
Atrium (architecture) (plural: atria), a large open space within a building
Atria gens, an ancient Roman family
Atria Institute on gender equality and women's history
Atria, a fictional planet in the TV series Star-Crossed

See also
Adria (disambiguation)
Atri (disambiguation)
Atrium (disambiguation)